The siege of Graudenz was a siege during the Napoleonic Wars between 22 January and 11 December, 1807. As part of the War of the Fourth Coalition the Prussian fortress at Graudenz in West Prussia was besieged by forces of the French Empire and its allies. The garrison, commanded by General Wilhelm René de l'Homme de Courbière, withheld blockade and siege for some 11 months, long past the formal Peace of Tilsit. The French abandoned the siege after the borders between Prussia and the new Duchy of Warsaw were defined; Graudenz staying a Prussian possession until after World War I.

See also 
Battle of Grudziądz
Battle of Grudziądz (1659)

Notes

References

External links

Graudenz
Grudziądz
Graudenz
Graudenz
Graudenz
Graudenz
Graudenz
Graudenz
Graudenz
History of Kuyavian-Pomeranian Voivodeship